Wrigley Field  is a Major League Baseball (MLB) stadium on the North Side of Chicago, Illinois. It is the home of the Chicago Cubs, one of the city's two MLB franchises. It first opened in 1914 as Weeghman Park for Charles Weeghman's Chicago Whales of the Federal League, which folded after the 1915 baseball season. The Cubs played their first home game at the park on April 20, 1916, defeating the Cincinnati Reds 7–6 in 11 innings. Chewing gum magnate William Wrigley Jr. of the Wrigley Company acquired the Cubs in 1921. It was named Cubs Park from 1920 to 1926, before being renamed Wrigley Field in 1927. The current seating capacity is 41,649. It is actually the second stadium to be named Wrigley Field, as a Los Angeles ballpark with the same name opened in 1925. 

In the North Side community area of Lakeview in the Wrigleyville neighborhood, Wrigley Field is on an irregular block bounded by Clark and Addison streets to the west and south, and Waveland and Sheffield avenues to the north and east. Wrigley Field is nicknamed "The Friendly Confines", a phrase popularized by "Mr. Cub", Hall of Fame shortstop and first baseman Ernie Banks. The oldest park in the National League, it is the second-oldest in the majors after Fenway Park (1912), and the only remaining Federal League park.  The park was designated a National Historic Landmark in 2020.

Wrigley Field is known for its ivy-covered brick outfield wall, the unusual wind patterns off Lake Michigan, the iconic red marquee over the main entrance, the hand-turned scoreboard, its location in a primarily residential neighborhood with no parking lots and views from the rooftops behind the outfield, and for being the last Major League park to have lights installed for night games, in 1988. Between 1921 and 1970, it was also the home of the Chicago Bears of the National Football League, and was the home of the Chicago Cardinals (now the Arizona Cardinals) of the National Football League from 1931 to 1938.

History

Baseball executive Charles Weeghman hired his architect Zachary Taylor Davis to design the park, which was ready for baseball by the home opener on April 23, 1914. The original tenants, the Chicago Whales (also called the Chi-Feds), came in second in the Federal League rankings in 1914, and won the league championship in 1915.

In late 1915, Weeghman's Federal League folded. The resourceful Weeghman formed a syndicate including the chewing gum manufacturer William Wrigley Jr. to buy the Chicago Cubs from Charles P. Taft for about $500,000. Weeghman immediately moved the Cubs from the dilapidated West Side Grounds to his two-year-old park.

In 1918, Wrigley acquired the controlling interest in the club. In November 1926, he renamed the park Wrigley Field. In 1927, an upper deck was added, and in 1937, Bill Veeck, the son of the club president, planted ivy vines against the outfield walls after seeing the ivy planted at Perry Stadium, Indianapolis.

Renovation
 

The Ricketts family aggressively pursued a Wrigley Field renovation since buying the team and the stadium in 2009. During the annual Cubs Convention in January 2013, the family revealed the 1060 Project, which called for a $575-million, privately funded rehabilitation of the stadium to be completed over the course of five years. The proposal was vast and included planned improvements to, among other things, the stadium's façade, infrastructure, restrooms, concourses, suites, press box, moving the bullpens and clubhouses, as well as the addition of restaurants, patio areas, batting tunnels, a  jumbotron, and an adjacent hotel, plaza and office-retail complex.

After months of negotiations between the team, local Alderman Tom Tunney, and then-Mayor Rahm Emanuel, the plan obtained the endorsements of both the city's Landmarks Commission and Plan Commission before receiving final approval by the Chicago City Council in July 2013. Before work on the project began, the team wanted the rooftop owners to agree not to pursue legal action challenging the construction and continued to negotiate privately with them – offering to reduce the size and number of signs to be built – in order to gain their assent. The team could not come to terms with the rooftop owners who had a lease agreement with the team until 2023 in exchange for paying 17% of the gross revenues. In May 2014, the Cubs announced they would pursue the original 2013 plan to modify the park. Over the course of the next three years, the Ricketts family began to purchase many of the rooftop locations.

1060 Project renovation
Phase one of the 1060 Project began on September 29, 2014. During the offseason, the bleachers in both outfields were expanded and the stadium's footprint was extended further onto both Waveland and Sheffield Avenues. A  Jumbotron scoreboard was added to the left field bleachers, topped with a sign advertising Wintrust Financial, a Rosemont-based bank and a Cubs Legacy Partner; the "W" in Wintrust flashes after every Cubs win. A  video scoreboard was also added in the right field bleachers, and the parking lots along Clark Street were excavated for underground players' locker rooms and lounges.

After the close of the extended 2015 season, work began on phase two of the project.

Exterior renovations of the park seek to restore design elements present before the 1960s. These details include ornamental muted-green grill-work and red terra cotta roofing.

Phase three of the 1060 Project was completed before the start of the 2017 season. The left and right field bullpens were relocated to enclosed areas under the bleachers, the brick walls were extended toward the field, and new seating was added in the vacated bullpen areas. A visiting team "batting tunnel" was also added. Partial façade replacement and concourse restoration was completed along Addison Street, along with structural improvements to the right field bleachers. The outfield turf was replaced just weeks before the start of the season. The Cubs Plaza building just to the west of Wrigley was finalized, and the "Park at Wrigley", the area above Cubs players dressing rooms, was in use for fans before and during games. Construction of Hotel Zachary along the west side of Clark Street was ongoing.

The fourth phase of improvements began at the conclusion of the 2017 season. The dugouts were moved farther down the left and right field foul lines to make room for two of the four new luxury clubs. The seating area behind home plate was reconstructed to locate another of the new clubs. The final upper level club was planned for the 2019 season. The Hotel Zachary, just across Clark Street, was open for business in time for the Cubs' first home game on April 9, 2018.

National Historic Landmark
Near the start of the renovations, the Ricketts applied for National Historic Landmark status for Wrigley Field in 2013. A similar plan had been successfully pursued by the owners of Fenway Park in Boston. To achieve landmark status, the renovations had to respect and reflect the historic character of the stadium. The benefit to the owners is that landmark status allows them to claim tax credits for the renovation. National landmark status was awarded in 2020, with the U.S. Secretary of the Interior commenting that "the historical significance of Wrigley Field is interwoven into our nation's story and a key part of what has become America's beloved pastime for over a century".

Firsts since renovation
On May 26, 2015, Cubs rookie third baseman Kris Bryant became the first to hit the new left field videoscreen with his  home run. On October 13, the Cubs clinched a playoff series at home in Wrigley Field for the first time in franchise history, with a 6–4 victory in game four of the 2015 NLDS. After Anthony Rizzo hit what would be the game-winning and series-winning home run in the sixth inning, Kyle Schwarber's seventh inning home run ball landed on top of the right field scoreboard. The ball was left in place, encased in clear plexiglass to protect it from the elements, but was removed in 2016.

100th Anniversary
During the 2014 season, the Cubs celebrated the centennial of Wrigley Field. Each decade was represented during ten homestands throughout the season. April 23, the 100th anniversary of the stadium's opening, saw the Cubs playing the Arizona Diamondbacks in a throwback game. Each team represented one of the teams which played in the inaugural game at the stadium. The Cubs wore the uniforms of the Chicago Whales (Federals), the original occupants of the stadium, and the Diamondbacks wore uniforms representing the Kansas City Packers, whom the Federals played on April 23, 1914.

Lawsuit 
On July 14, 2022, the United States government filed a lawsuit against the Chicago Cubs, operator of the stadium, for alleged violations of the Americans with Disabilities Act, claiming that the stadium did not accommodate spectators with disabilities, primarily those in wheelchairs. The lawsuit states that, during recent renovations, the stadium operator removed the best wheelchair seating, failed to add wheelchair accessibility to premium club rooms, and stuck the wheelchair seats behind railings, which could obstruct the view of those in wheelchairs. The Chicago Cubs, however, released a statement, saying that "Wrigley Field is now more accessible than it was in its 108-year history".

Features
Wrigley Field follows the jewel box ballpark design that was popular in the early part of the 20th century. The two recessed wall areas, or "wells", located both in left and right field, give those areas more length than if the wall were to follow the contour from center field. It is also in those wells, when cross winds are blowing, that balls have a habit of bouncing in all directions. In addition, there is a long chain-link fence strip running the entire length of the outfield wall, the base of which is about two feet down from the top of the wall and the top of which projects out at an angle, primarily used to keep fans from falling out of the bleacher area and onto the field of play, which is about seven to ten feet below the top of the wall. Called "the Basket" by players and fans alike, the rules of the field state that any ball landing within the basket is ruled a home run, making the distance to hit a home run in Wrigley Field actually shorter than the location of the outfield wall.

Ivy-covered outfield walls

The ballpark is famous for its outfield walls which are covered by ivy. In the first weeks of the baseball season, the ivy has not leafed out, and all that is visible are the vines on which it grows. However, as the baseball season progresses further into spring, the ivy grows thick and green, disguising the hard brick surface of the outfield wall. In the autumn, generally during postseason, the ivy turns red. On April 7, 2013, Total Pro Sports named Wrigley Field the "Best Place to Catch a Game in 2013", owing the award primarily to its architecture and ivy-coated fields.

In 1937, the stadium was renovated and P. K. Wrigley discussed beautification with then-Cubs President William Veeck Sr., who suggested planting ivy on the outfield walls. The ivy was originally English ivy, but was later changed to Parthenocissus tricuspidata, commonly called Boston Ivy or Japanese Bittersweet, which can endure the harsh Chicago winters better than its English cousin. Cuttings from the ivy were sold by local vendors. The Cubs attempted to grow the ivy on the outside of Wrigley Field as well, but the plantings were often stolen, so the Cubs abandoned the plans.

Following a later change in MLB rules, which requires all outfield walls to be padded, Wrigley Field was grandfathered into the rules, meaning it is the only stadium in the league without padded walls because of the ivy. In 2004, the ivy was specifically included in Wrigley Field's Landmark Designation by the Chicago City Council. Although the ivy appears to "pad" the bricks, it is of little practical use in this regard. There have been occasions of fielders being injured when slamming into the wall while pursuing a fly ball.

Under the ground rules of Wrigley Field, if a baseball gets into the ivy and gets stuck, the batter is awarded a ground rule double. Outfielders often raise their arms up when the ball goes into the ivy, signaling to an umpire to go out and rule on the play. However, if the ball becomes dislodged or the fielder reaches into the vines to try and retrieve it, it is considered in play and the runners can advance.

Dimensions
 
The distances from home plate to various points in the outfield have remained essentially unchanged since the bleachers were remodeled during the 1937 season. They were originally marked by wooden numbers cut from plywood, painted white, and placed in gaps where the ivy was not allowed to grow. Since the early 1980s, the numbers have been painted directly on the bricks, in yellow. Although the power-alley dimensions are relatively cozy, the foul lines are currently the deepest in the major leagues.
The point where the bleacher wall begins to curve inward in left-center field, one of the two "wells", is an unmarked . It is closer to true center field than its right-center counterpart is. As of 2004, the backstop is listed in media sources as  behind home plate. Although that distance is standard, the relatively small foul ground area in general gives an advantage to batters. The ivy-covered walls in the left and right field corners were reduced from 15 to 11 feet in height prior to the 2015 season as part of phase one of the 1060 project.  At around the same time, advertising signs above the corners of the left and right field wall were installed, raising the bleachers by about three feet. It is a widespread misconception that the recently added signage are in-play and a part of the wall, neither of which are correct. The distance from where the front row bleachers are to the field, including the newly placed signs, is still 15 feet.

Rooftop seats

When Wrigley Field was constructed, the buildings along Waveland and Sheffield avenues gave spectators a view of what was going on inside the ballpark, but did not become popular spectator areas until the 1929 World Series. The 1938 World Series brought paying spectators to the rooftops, however, fans typically sat in lawn chairs and brought their own food and beverages. In the mid-1980s, rooftop owners began to organize more formally as businesses, seeking to extract more revenue by updating the rooftops with bleacher-style grandstands. The Sky Box on Sheffield opened in 1993, originally catering primarily to corporate groups. Today, it is complete with a two-tier roof deck, indoor clubhouse, fully staffed bars on three levels, and an elevator.

In 1998, the city started requiring rooftop owners to have a license and began to regulate the venues. In 2003, relations between rooftop owners and the Cubs worsened when the team put up a large screen to block the view of the rooftops, exemplifying what is known as a spite fence. The Cubs then sued most rooftop businesses that year, claiming they were stealing from the team's product and "unjustly enriching themselves".

In 2004, the building owners agreed to share a portion of their proceeds with the Cubs. Rooftop owners were required to pay the team 17% of their gross revenue in an agreement lasting until 2023. The Cubs obtained permission from the city to expand the ballpark's own bleachers out over the sidewalks and do some additional construction on the open area of the property to the west, bordered by Clark and Waveland, and to close the remnant of Seminary Avenue that also existed on the property. The rooftop seats are now effectively part of the ballpark's seating area, although they are not included in the seating capacity figure.

In July 2016, former rooftop owner R. Marc Hamid was convicted on nine counts of mail fraud and illegal bank structuring. Hamid had been underreporting attendance at the Sky Box on Sheffield from 2008 to 2011, and covered up over $1 million in revenue while also avoiding hundreds of thousands of dollars in taxes and royalties that violated the agreement rooftop owners had with the Cubs. In January 2017, he was sentenced to 18 months in federal prison.

In 2013, the owners threatened suit when the team announced plans to renovate the stadium and potentially disrupt the sight lines. In May 2014, when the rooftop owners did not agree to a scaled down plan for renovations, the Cubs' owners announced their intentions to implement the original 2013 plan for renovations even if it meant battling the issue in court. Cubs owner Ricketts said Wrigley has "the worst player facilities in Major League Baseball...I am saying it is the time to invest in Wrigley Field and do the things that our competitors do." By the end of the 2016 season, the Ricketts family had acquired ten of the rooftop locations, with a financial stake in an eleventh.

Some of the rooftops became legendary in their own right. The Lakeview Baseball Club, which sits across Sheffield Avenue (right-field) from the stadium displayed a sign that read "Eamus Catuli!" (roughly Latin for "Let's Go Cubs!"—catuli translating to "whelps", the nearest Latin equivalent), flanked by a counter indicating the Cubs' long legacy of futility. The counter was labeled "AC" for "Anno Catulorum", or "In the Year of the Cubs". Prior to the team's 2016 championship, it read "AC0871108", with the first two digits indicating the number of years since the Cubs' last division championship as of the end of the previous season (2008), the next two digits indicating the number of years since the Cubs won the National League Pennant (1945), and the last three digits indicating the number of years since their last World Series win. After winning the World Series in 2016, the sign was updated to "AC0000000".

Seating capacity

Attendance records
41,688 – July 12, 2015 high mark after bleacher renovation
42,411 – Games 3 & 4 of the 2015 NLDS
42,445 - Game 3 of the 2017 NLDS

Unusual wind patterns
In April and May, the wind often comes off Lake Michigan (less than a mile to the east), with a northeast wind "blowing in" to knock down potential home runs and turn them into outs. In the summer, however, or on any warm, breezy day, the wind often comes from the south and the southwest, "blowing out" with the potential to turn normally harmless fly balls into home runs. A third variety is the cross-wind, which typically runs from the left field corner to the right field corner and causes all sorts of havoc. Depending on the direction of the wind, Wrigley can either be one of the friendliest parks in the major leagues for pitchers or among the worst. This makes Wrigley one of the most unpredictable parks in the Major Leagues. Many Cubs fans check their nearest flag before heading to the park on game days for an indication of what the game might be like. This is less of a factor for night games, however, because the wind does not blow as hard after the sun goes down.

With the wind blowing in, pitchers can dominate and no-hitters have resulted. The last two by a Cubs pitcher occurred near the beginning and the end of the 1972 season, by Burt Hooton and Milt Pappas respectively. Not until Cole Hamels of the Philadelphia Phillies no-hit the Cubs in 2015 would another no-hitter be pitched at Wrigley. In the seventh inning of Ken Holtzman's first no-hitter, on August 19, 1969, Hank Aaron of the Atlanta Braves hit a ball that looked headed for the bleachers, but the wind caught it just enough for left fielder Billy Williams to leap up and snare it.

With the wind blowing out, some true tape-measure home runs have been hit by well-muscled batters. Sammy Sosa and Dave "Kong" Kingman broke windows in the apartment buildings across Waveland Avenue several times, and Glenallen Hill put one on a rooftop. Batters have occasionally slugged it into, or to the side of, the first row or two of the "upper deck" of the center field bleachers. The longest blast was probably hit by Dave Kingman on a very windy day in 1976, while with the Mets. According to local legend, that day, Kingman launched a bomb that landed on the third porch roof on the east (center field) side of Kenmore Avenue some 550 feet away. No batter has ever hit the center field scoreboard, but it has been struck by a golf ball hit by Sam Snead using a two-iron.

Hand-turned scoreboard

The scoreboard was installed in 1937, when Bill Veeck installed the new bleachers. It has remained in place ever since, and has only seen minor technical and cosmetic modifications. The clock was added in 1941, and a fifth row of scores was added to each side in 1961, with a sixth by 1969. A set of light stands facing onto the scoreboard was added in 1988 with the introduction of night games. 

Along with Fenway Park's scoreboard and Minute Maid Park, Oakland-Alameda County Coliseum and Oracle Park's out of town scoreboards, Wrigley is one of the last parks to maintain a hand-turned scoreboard. A number turner watches the score changes on a computer (a ticker tape machine was used in the past), and updates the scoreboard by manually replacing the numbers from within the scoreboard. The scoreboard is made of sheet steel. The numbers that are placed into the inning windows are also steel, painted forest green, and numbered with white numerals. The box for the game playing at Wrigley uses yellow numerals for the current inning. The clock, which sits at the top center of the scoreboard, has never lost time in its -year existence.

Standing over the clock are three flagpoles, one for each division in the National League. There are 15 flags, one for each National League team, and their order on the flagpoles reflects the current standings. The entrance to the scoreboard is a trap-door on the bottom. On the reverse of the scoreboard, visible from the CTA elevated trains, is a blue Cubs pennant in white outlined in red neon. The scoreboard was extensively rehabilitated for the 2010 season.

Unlike the home of the Red Sox, the scoreboard at Wrigley is mounted above the centerfield bleachers, rather than at ground level, making it harder to hit during play. No players have hit the current scoreboard, although at least three have come close: Roberto Clemente to the left side on May 17, 1959; and Bill Nicholson and Eddie Mathews to the right on August 22, 1942,{{efn|Ever since 1989, a home run hit by Nicholson in 1948—later identified as the one hit on April 24 off the Cardinal's Al Brazle,—has been paired with Clemente's 1959 near miss. However, a recent study  by Chicago historian Sam Pathy, documenting the longest home runs ever hit at Wrigley Field and drawing on a multitude of contemporaneous news stories, uncovered no evidence of this alleged proximity. Moreover, Nicholson himself, though apparently never consulted about the 1989 story, had been quoted as early as April 20, 1953—exactly 2 days before Mathews would make his own scoreboard bid—to the effect that the longest home run he'd ever hit had exited Wrigley Field "over the flower pot in [sic] the center-field scoreboard" and was given up by pitcher Luke Hamlin, a longtime Dodger whose final season in the National League, 1942, was spent with Pittsburgh (where he'd been sent as part of the package bringing Arky Vaughan to Brooklyn). According to Baseball Reference, and notwithstanding the Inquirer's parenthetical insertion of "Brooklyn" after Hamlin's name, Nicholson, in the course of his major league career, hit exactly two home runs off Hamlin, both occurring in the same game, on August 15, 1942. That being said, there's absolutely no indication in all the reporting on Nicholson's two home runs off Hamlin, plus the other he hit that day, that any one of them was particularly prodigious, much less that any of them actually escaped the 'Friendly Confines' altogether, near the scoreboard or otherwise. However, exactly one week later, Hamlin and his home run prowess were once again in the headlines, as Chicago walked off the lowly Reds when "Nicholson crashed a home run into Sheffield Avenue."<ref>"Cubs Outlast Reds". San Bernardino Sun. August 23, 1942. Retrieved February 3, 2020. </ref>}} and April 22, 1953, respectively.Jenkinson, Bill (2010). Baseball's Ultimate Power. Guilford, CT: Lyons Press. p. 39. .

In 2010, the Cubs considered adding a video screen to the stadium, but the hand-turned scoreboard cannot be moved due to the park's landmark status, which also prohibits even simple facelifts, such as adding two more games on either side (there are 15 teams in both the National and American Leagues) of the 12-game, 24-team scoreboard (reflecting the MLB from 1969 to 1976), so up to three games (one NL, one AL and the interleague) each day cannot be posted. Those games may eventually be part of the auxiliary video board currently on the right field that may also be added in left field. Most Cubs players support the concept of a video board, and work on two additional scoreboards began at the end of the 2014 season.

On March 21, 2013, it was announced that Alderman Tom Tunney wanted to demolish the scoreboard to clear the view for nearby residents, who watch games from their rooftops. "Demolishing the landmark old scoreboard has never been part of any plan discussed or envisioned by the Ricketts family," said Dennis Culloton, a spokesman for Cubs chairman Tom Ricketts. To date, there is a third generation scoreboard operator whose grandfather began working in the hand-turned scoreboard at its inception.

Main entry marquee

Directly over the main entrance to the stadium stands the most familiar icon of the exterior of the ballpark: a large, red, art deco-style marquee, with "Wrigley Field, Home of Chicago Cubs" painted in white. The marquee was installed around 1934, and was originally painted blue with changeable letters—similar to the scoreboard—to announce upcoming games. The marquee originally read "Home of the Cubs", which was replaced with "Home of Chicago Cubs" by 1939. In years when the Bears played there, the sign was changed appropriately during football season. On March 23, 1960, the Cubs repainted the sign red.

In 1982, a two-line announcement board was replaced with an electronic LED message board, and a backlit advertising panel was added below (this is now solid red). The marquee uses red neon lights at night, showing the familiar "Wrigley Field" in red, with the rest of the sign in darkness. A Budweiser Beer slogan was on the lower panel in the early 1980s, around the time when the team added the LED signage. Past and present owners of the park have used the marquee in some way as the park's trademark of sorts: the CTA Addison street platform that serves Wrigley Field uses an image of the marquee painted on walls to announce the destination. In November 2010, the marquee was painted purple with an Allstate Insurance logo for the Northwestern Wildcats, who played as the home team against the Illinois Fighting Illini in a Big Ten football game.

In 2015, a Toyota emblem was placed on the lower panel just below the LED sign on the marquee; previously, the area was used for logos of transient corporate sponsors and team initiatives. Toyota, one of the team's "legacy partners", began displaying other signage in and around the park in 2016, including branding on all of its parking lots.

The marquee was temporarily removed and restored for the 2016 season, including new paint, a new LED display board, and new neon lights. The back of the sign was given a new green paint job as well, which can now be seen from inside the terrace level.

Lights
The Cubs were a holdout against night games for decades, not installing lights at Wrigley until 1988, after baseball officials announced that the park would be prohibited from hosting any future postseason games without lights. Before then, all games at Wrigley were played during the day. Night games are still limited in number by agreement with the city council.

In 1942, then-owner Philip K. Wrigley had planned to install lights, but they were scrapped for the World War II effort. On July 1, 1943, the All-American Girls Professional Baseball League's first midseason All-Star Game was played under temporary lights at Wrigley Field, between two teams composed of South Bend Blue Sox and Rockford Peaches players versus Kenosha Comets and Racine Belles players. It was also the first night game ever played in the ballpark.

The 1984 World Series was scheduled to start in the National League park, but the MLB actually had a contingency plan to instead start the Series at the American League park in the event that the Cubs won the NLCS against the San Diego Padres. This would have allowed the Wrigley Field-hosted (i.e. daytime) games to be held over the weekend; in return, only one night game (game 3 on Friday) would have been lost. Had the Cubs advanced to the Series instead of the Padres, the Detroit Tigers would have hosted games 1, 2, 6, and 7 (on Tuesday and Wednesday nights), while the Cubs would have hosted games 3, 4, and 5 (on Friday, Saturday and Sunday), with all three games in Chicago starting no later than 1:30 p.m. CST. Since the Padres wound up winning the 1984 NLCS, these plans proved moot.

In the late 1980s, Cubs management insisted that the team was in danger of leaving Wrigley if lights were not installed, and Major League Baseball threatened to make the Cubs play postseason "home" games at Busch Stadium in St. Louis. After 5,687 consecutive day games played by the Cubs at Wrigley, the lights were finally lit on August 8, 1988, for a game against the Philadelphia Phillies. However, that game was rained out after 3½ innings, and the first official night game took place the following evening against the New York Mets, whom the Cubs beat 6–4.

On November 7, 2022 Wrigley Field upgraded to LED field lights. 

Stadium usage

Baseball

Wrigley Field's first tenant was the Federal League team, the Chicago Whales, from 1914 to 1915. It has served as the home baseball park for Major League Baseball's Chicago Cubs franchise since 1916.

Football
The Chicago Bears of the National Football League played at Wrigley Field from 1921 to 1970 before relocating to Soldier Field. The team had transferred from Decatur, and retained the name "Staleys" for the 1921 season. They renamed themselves the Bears in order to identify with the baseball team, then a common practice in the NFL. Wrigley Field once held the record for the most NFL games played in a single stadium, with 365 regular season games, but this record was surpassed in 2003 by Giants Stadium in New Jersey, thanks to its dual-occupancy by the New York Giants and New York Jets. On September 14, 2003, the game played between the Jets and Miami Dolphins was the 366th regular season NFL game at Giants Stadium, breaking Wrigley's regular season record. The 50 seasons the Bears spent at Wrigley Field had been an NFL record until 2006, when Lambeau Field duplicated this feat by hosting the Green Bay Packers for a 50th season and broke it in 2007. Soldier Field also matched the accomplishment when the Bears played there for their 50th season in 2021.

Initially, the Bears worked with the stands that were there. Eventually, they acquired a large, portable bleacher section that spanned the right and center field areas and covered most of the existing bleacher seating and part of the right field corner seating. This "East Stand" raised Wrigley's football capacity to about 47,000, or a net gain of perhaps 9,000 seats over normal capacity. After the Bears left, this structure would live on for several years as the "North Stand" at Soldier Field, until it was replaced by permanent seating.

The football field ran north-to-south, i.e. from left field to the foul side of first base. The remodeling of the bleachers made for a very tight fit for the gridiron. In fact, the corner of the south end zone was literally in the visiting baseball team's dugout, which was filled with pads for safety, and required a special ground rule that sliced off that corner of the end zone. The end zone was also shorter than the north, as the south end zone was eight yards, compared to the regulation ten yards. One corner of the north end line ran just inches short of the left field wall. There is a legend that Bears fullback Bronko Nagurski steamrolled through the line head down, and ran all the way through that end zone, smacking his leather-helmeted head on the bricks. He went back to the bench and told then-coach George Halas, "That last guy gave me quite a lick!" That kind of incident prompted the Bears to hang some padding in front of the wall.

The Bears are second only to the Packers in total NFL championships, and all but one of those (their only Super Bowl championship) came during their tenure at Wrigley. After a half-century, they found themselves compelled to move as the NFL wanted every one of its stadiums to seat at least 50,000 as a result of the then-recent AFL–NFL merger. The Bears held one game at Dyche Stadium (now Ryan Field) on the Northwestern University campus in 1970, but otherwise continued at Wrigley until their transfer to the lakefront ended their five-decades run on the north side.

One remnant of the Bears' time at Wrigley was uncovered during the offseason rebuilding of the playing field between 2007 and 2008: the foundations for the goal posts. Five NFL championship games were played at Wrigley Field: 1933, 1937, 1941, 1943, and 1963. Coupled with the Chicago Bears, the Chicago Cardinals (now the Arizona Cardinals) of the NFL called Wrigley Field home from 1931 to 1938. Born on the South Side of Chicago, the Cardinals also played their home games at Normal Park, Comiskey Park, and Soldier Field.

The Northwestern Wildcats and the Illinois Fighting Illini played a college football game at Wrigley Field on November 20, 2010. It was the first football game at Wrigley Field since 1970, and the first collegiate football game there since 1938, when the DePaul Blue Demons played its regular games at Wrigley. The field used an east–west field configuration (third base to right field). In order to keep the playing field at regulation size, the safety clearances for each end zone to the walls in the field were considerably less than normal. In particular, the east (right field) end zone came under scrutiny as its end zone was wedged extremely close to the right field wall (as close as one foot in some areas), forcing the goal posts to be hung from the right field wall in order to fit. Despite extra padding provided in these locations, it was decided that all offensive plays for both teams play to the west end zone, where there was more safety clearance. The east end zone could still be used on defensive and special teams touchdowns, as well as defensive safeties; and, in fact, there was one interception run back for an eastbound touchdown. Big Ten Commissioner Jim Delany said that, as late as three days before the game, he had only been apprised that the situation wasn't "anything other than tight". When he had a chance to fully vet the situation, however, he concluded that the space surrounding the east end zone was smaller than the minimum of six feet stipulated in NCAA rules, and it would have been too great of a risk to allow offensive plays to be run toward that end zone. The Fighting Illini won the game 48–27, taking home the Land of Lincoln Trophy, which was introduced in 2009.

Northwestern football intends to return to Wrigley Field in 2022 and 2024. As a result of the 2017–18 redesign of the home (third base) dugout and its adjacent seating into removable modules, the playing field will accommodate a regulation size 120-yard football field that will run east-west. A Northwestern football game had also been scheduled for Wrigley in 2020, but was relocated to Northwestern's Ryan Field due to the COVID-19 pandemic. As a makeup, Northwestern relocated their 2021 home game against Purdue to Wrigley Field, which was held in November.

Soccer

The Chicago Sting of the North American Soccer League (NASL) used Wrigley, along with Comiskey Park, for their home matches during the late 1970s and early 1980s. The Sting hosted the San Diego Sockers at Wrigley on August 25, 1979, when the Bears were using Soldier Field. Unlike the Bears' football layout, the soccer pitch ran east to west, from right field to the foul territory on the third base side. Soccer returned to Wrigley Field in July 2012, when Italian club A.S. Roma played Poland's Zaglebie Lubin in a friendly match.

Hockey

On January 1, 2009, the National Hockey League played its 2009 Winter Classic at Wrigley Field, pitting two "Original Six" teams – the host Chicago Blackhawks and the visiting Detroit Red Wings – in an outdoor ice hockey game. The rink ran across the field from first base to third base with second base being covered by roughly the center of the rink. The attendance for this game was 40,818. The Red Wings won 6–4.

Concerts

Since 2005, Wrigley Field has been opened on a limited basis to popular concerts, but not without some controversy. Local neighborhood groups have expressed concerns about the impact of concert crowds and noise on the surrounding residential neighborhood, particularly in 2009, when three concerts were added to the schedule, one conflicting with an annual neighborhood festival.

List of concerts

Traditions and mainstays
Corporate sponsorship

Wrigley Field shares its name with the Wrigley Company, as the park was named for its then-owner William Wrigley Jr., the company's CEO. As early as the 1920s, before the park became officially known as Wrigley Field, the scoreboard was topped by the elf-like "Doublemint Twins", posed as a pitcher and a batter. There were also ads painted on the bare right field wall early in the ballpark's history, prior to the 1923 remodeling, which put bleachers there. After that, the Doublemint elves were the only visible in-park advertising. The elves were removed permanently in 1937, when the bleachers and scoreboard were rebuilt. It would be about 44 years before in-park advertising would reappear.

Ironically given the roots of its name, Wrigley Field had been a notable exception to the trend of selling corporate naming rights to sporting venues. The Tribune Company, the owners of the park from 1981 to 2009, chose not to rename the ballpark, utilizing other ways to bring in corporate sponsorship. During the mid-1980s, Anheuser-Busch placed Budweiser and Bud Light advertisements beneath the center field scoreboard. Bud Light became the sponsor of the rebuilt bleachers in 2006.

In the early 2000s, following the trend of many ballparks, a green-screen chroma key board was installed behind home plate in the line of sight of the center field camera to allow electronic "rotating" advertisements visible only to TV audiences. By 2006, the board was set up to allow advertisements to be both physical and electronic (they can be seen in both live and replay shots).

In 2007, the first on-field advertising appeared since the park's early days. Sporting goods firm Under Armour placed its logo on the double-doors between the ivy on the outfield wall in left-center and right-center fields. Advertisements were also placed in the dugouts, originally for Sears department stores, then Walter E. Smithe furniture and currently State Farm insurance.

For 2008 and 2009, the Cubs worked out an agreement with the Chicago Board Options Exchange to allow the CBOE to auction some 70 box seat season tickets and award naming rights to them.

For the 2009 season, the Cubs announced that the renovated restaurant space in the southeast corner of Wrigley Field, formerly known as the Friendly Confines Cafe, would be renamed the Captain Morgan Club.

On October 27, 2009, Thomas S. Ricketts officially took over 95% ownership of the Cubs and Wrigley Field, and 20% ownership of Comcast SportsNet Chicago. The Tribune retained 5% ownership. Ricketts, however, has expressed no interest in selling the naming rights to the park, preferring that it retain the name it has used since 1926.

Outside venues
Corporate sponsorship has not been limited to the park itself. Wrigley Field is famous for its view of the neighborhood buildings across Waveland and Sheffield Avenues. In addition to spectators standing or sitting on the apartment roofs, corporate sponsors have frequently taken advantage of those locations as well. In the earliest days of Weeghman Park, one building across Sheffield Avenue advertised a local hangout known as Bismarck Gardens (later called the Marigold Gardens after World War I). That same building has since advertised for the Torco Oil Company, Southwest Airlines, the Miller Brewing Company, and Gilbert's Craft Sausages.

A building across from deep right-center field was topped by a neon sign for Baby Ruth candy beginning in the mid-1930s and running for some 40 years. That placement by the Chicago-based Curtiss Candy Company (which is now under Nestlé), coincidentally positioned in the line of sight of "Babe Ruth's called shot", proved fortuitous when games began to be televised in the 1940s—the sign was also in the line of sight of the ground level camera behind and to the left of home plate. The aging sign was eventually removed in the early 1970s.

Another long-standing venue for a sign is the sloping roof of a building behind left-center field. Unsuitable for the bleachers that now decorate many of those buildings, that building's angling roof has been painted in the form of a large billboard since at least the 1940s. In recent years, it has borne a bright-red Budweiser sign, and beginning in 2009, an advertisement for Horseshoe Casino. Other buildings have carried signs sponsoring beers, such as Old Style (when it was a Cubs broadcasting sponsor) and Miller, and also WGN-TV, which has telecast Cubs games since April 1948.

Legacy partners
In January 2013, the Ricketts family launched "Legacy Partners", a marketing effort to sell new advertising in and around the renovated Wrigley Field. In conjunction with the new "W Partners", the Cubs entered into 10-year agreements with its largest advertisers.
 – Anheuser-Busch
 – Under Armour
 – ATI Physical Therapy, a national Sports Medicine and Rehabilitation organization
 – Wintrust Financial Corporation, a Chicago-based regional bank holding company
 – Sloan Valve
 – American Airlines
 – Nuveen Investments
 – Advocate Health Care, the largest health care provider in Illinois.
 – Toyota Motor Corporation A permanent position just below the Clark and Addison marquee and other signage in and around the park and Wrigley Field parking lots.
 – PepsiCo

 Win flag 

Beginning in the days of P.K. Wrigley and the 1937 bleacher/scoreboard reconstruction, a flag with either a "W" or an "L" has flown from atop the scoreboard masthead, indicating the day's result. In case of a doubleheader that is split, both flags are flown.

Past Cubs media guides show that the original flags were blue with a white "W" and white with a blue "L", the latter coincidentally suggesting "surrender". In 1978, blue and white lights were mounted atop the scoreboard, to further denote wins and losses.

The flags were replaced in the early 1980s, and the color schemes were reversed with the "win flag" being white with a blue W, and the "loss flag" the opposite. In 1982, the retired number of Ernie Banks was flying on a foul pole, as white with blue numbers, in 1987, the retired number of Billy Williams joined Banks, the two flags were positioned from the foul poles, Banks from left field, and Williams from right field. Later on, the team retired numbers for Ron Santo, Ryne Sandberg, Ferguson Jenkins and Greg Maddux, with Jenkins and Maddux both using the same number (31).

Keeping with tradition, fans are known to bring win flags to home and away games, and displaying them after a Cubs win. Flags are also sold at the ballpark. On April 24, 2008, the Cubs flew an extra white flag displaying "10,000" in blue, along with the win flag, as the 10,000th win in team history was achieved on the road the previous night. Alongside the tradition of the "W" and "L" flags, the song "Go, Cubs, Go" is sung after each home win (it was also sung by visiting Cubs fans in game 7 of the 2016 World Series at Progressive Field in Cleveland, where the Cubs clinched their first championship since 1908). Also, following the 2015 addition of the park's Daktronics video screens, the large "W" in the "Wintrust" logo on the left field video screen is kept on following Cubs' wins.

"Take Me Out to the Ball Game"
The tradition of singing "Take Me Out to the Ball Game" at Cubs home games began when Hall of Fame announcer Harry Caray arrived in 1982 (he had sung it the preceding seven years as a broadcaster for the White Sox), and has remained a Wrigley Field staple. After Caray's death, the tradition of a guest conductor began, with former baseball players, other sports stars, actors, and other celebrities invited to sing during the Seventh Inning Stretch. Among the best-known guests have been the actor Bill Murray, former Bears coach Mike Ditka, former Cubs second baseman Ryne Sandberg, former pitcher Mike Krukow, former longtime Cubs first baseman Mark Grace, former Houston Rockets star Tracy McGrady, Chicago Blackhawks forwards Jonathan Toews and Patrick Kane, Chicago Bears quarterback Jay Cutler, comedian Jay Leno, NASCAR driver Jeff Gordon, singers Ozzy Osbourne and Eddie Vedder, former Chicago lead singer Peter Cetera, boxer and actor Mr. T, actor and lifelong Cub fan Gary Sinise, actors Tom Arnold, James Belushi, Bill Murray, WWE wrestler/Chicago native CM Punk, Vince Vaughn, actress Melissa McCarthy, and Illinois-native country music singer Brett Eldredge.

Organ music
Wrigley Field was the first Major League ballpark to introduce live organ music on April 26, 1941. The stadium's first organist was Ray Nelson. As of July 2019, organist Gary Pressy, holds the record for 2,653 consecutive games played; never having missed a day's work in 33 years. Today, most major league ballparks have replaced the traditional live organist with canned music programmed by a DJ. Pressy says: "I don't think it's a dying art, especially at Wrigley Field ... The team respects tradition."

Writing on the Wall
During the 2016 postseason, someone wrote a message in chalk on the outer brick wall of the stadium along Waveland and Sheffield avenues. This started a chain reaction and more fans began to write their own messages on the wall. The messages were anything from words of support expressed towards the team or just a name. Chalk covered a majority of the wall, to point where fans had to bring step ladders in order to reach upper spaces for their message. The Cubs themselves encouraged the event by supplying chalk and adding extra security. The event gained both local and national attention, receiving coverage from Fox Sports and The Boston Globe.

In popular culture

Wrigley Field had a brief cameo in the 1980 film The Blues Brothers, starring John Belushi and Dan Aykroyd as Jake and Elwood Blues. In the film, Elwood lists 1060 W. Addison as his fake home address on his Illinois driver's license, tricking the police and later the Illinois Nazis listening on police radio into heading for Wrigley Field. The 1984 film The Natural, starring Robert Redford, had a scene set at Wrigley but was actually filmed at All-High Stadium in Buffalo, New York. All other baseball action scenes in that movie were shot in Buffalo, at the since-demolished War Memorial Stadium.

During Cubs games, fans will often stand outside the park on Waveland Avenue, waiting for home run balls hit over the wall and out of the park. However, as a tradition, Cubs fans inside and sometimes even outside the park will promptly throw any home run ball hit by an opposing player back onto the field of play, a ritual depicted in the 1977 stage play Bleacher Bums and in the 1993 film Rookie of the Year.

The ballpark was featured in a scene in the 1986 film Ferris Bueller's Day Off, where the outside marquee read "Save Ferris". The director, John Hughes, originally wanted to film at Comiskey Park (he was a White Sox fan) but the team was out of town during filming. The 2006 film The Break-Up used Wrigley Field as the setting for its opening scene. An early 1990s film about Babe Ruth had the obligatory scene in Wrigley Field about the "called shot" (the ballpark also doubled as Yankee Stadium for the film). A scoreboard similar to the one existing in 1932 was used, atop an ivy wall (though that did not exist until later in the decade).

The ballpark was used for the establishing tryouts scene in A League of Their Own (1992). This film was a Hollywood account of the 1940s women's baseball league which Cubs owner P.K. Wrigley championed during World War II. Garry Marshall (older brother of the film's director Penny Marshall) has a cameo as "Walter Harvey", Wrigley's fictional alter ego. The sign behind the scoreboard was temporarily redone to read "Harvey Field", and filming was split between Wrigley and Cantigny Park near Wheaton, Illinois.

Many television series have made featured scenes set in Wrigley Field, including ER, Crime Story, Chicago Hope, Prison Break, Perfect Strangers, My Boys, Chicago Fire and Mike & Molly. Also, the animated comedy Family Guy featured a scene at Wrigley Field that parodied the Steve Bartman incident. In an episode of The Simpsons titled "He Loves to Fly and He D'ohs", upon arriving in Chicago, Homer walks past a number of famous Chicago landmarks, including Wrigley Field, followed by a generic-looking stadium bearing the name "Wherever the White Sox play". In 2007, the band Nine Inch Nails created a promotional audio skit, which involved Wrigley Field being the target of disgruntled war veteran's terrorist attack.

The late-1970s comedy stage play Bleacher Bums was set in the right field bleachers at Wrigley. The video of the play was also set on a stage, with bleachers suggesting Wrigley's layout, rather than in the actual ballpark's bleachers. The tradition of throwing opposition home run balls back was explained by Dennis Franz's character: "If someone hands you some garbage, you have to throw it back at them!"

In the cartoon series Biker Mice from Mars, the eponymous main characters hide out in the scoreboard of the stadium, which is named Quigley Field.

A dog park in the Wrightwood Neighbors section of Lincoln Park is named Wiggly Field (1997).

The stadium was also featured on the popular Travel Channel television show Great Hotels, starring Samantha Brown. She attended a game during a visit to Chicago.

Chicago folk singer Steve Goodman featured Wrigley Field as the setting for his popular Cubs lament "A Dying Cub Fan's Last Request", extolling both the trials of the Cubs and the place Wrigley Field holds in Cub fans' hearts. After his death from leukemia, Goodman's ashes were scattered at Wrigley Field as described in the lyrics.

The Statler Brothers' 1981 song "Don't Wait On Me" referred to a then-implausible situation: "When the lights go on at Wrigley Field". However, after lights were installed, the line was changed to "When they put a dome on Wrigley Field" for their 1989 Live-Sold Out album.

A few brief shots of Wrigley Field appear in the 1949 movie It Happens Every Spring. It is also seen on the History Channel's show Life After People.The stadium made a brief appearance in the open for the first episode of The Tonight Show with Conan O'Brien, with Conan rushing through the turnstiles while running from New York (where his previous show, Late Night with Conan O'Brien, was taped) to Los Angeles (where his new show was taped, until his role as host ended on January 22, 2010) and then running onto the field while being chased by Cubs security. The route O'Brien takes is somewhat misleading, as he is shown running south on Michigan Avenue past the Tribune Tower before arriving at Wrigley Field, which is well north of the Tribune Tower.

In the movie Category 6: Day of Destruction, a terrorist turns off all the electricity at the stadium for a few minutes to demonstrate how hackers could penetrate city electrical systems.

An overgrown Wrigley Field is shown in the new television series Revolution (2012).

In episode 9 of season 3 of The Man in the High Castle (2015), Wrigley Field makes a short appearance as the home of a fictional soccer team called the Chicago Norsemen who, according to a banner, were "1963 Annual Soccer Champions".

Wrigley Field was the site of the final task of The Amazing Race 29 finale, where one team member was guided by their partner communicating to them from the press box via a one-way radio to place numbers on the hand-turned scoreboard that corresponded to their team's final placement at the end of each of the previous eleven episodes, before searching the stadium's seats for their final clue.

On the Sonic Youth live album Smart Bar Chicago 85 the band introduce the final song, 'Making The Nature Scene', as being about 'Tripping on Acid at Wrigley Field'.

In the 2020 film, Greenland, Wrigley Field is shown still standing despite being severely damaged amidst the ruins of Chicago after the collision of an interstellar comet that collided with Earth.

Wesley Willis, an outsider musician and Chicago folk artist, had a track titled "Wrigley Field" on his album Greatest Hits Vol. 3, which he played with his band 'The Dragnews'.

Accessibility and transportation

As Addison is frequently crowded after games, many fans use , the next station to the north, and still less than a mile from the stadium.

Additionally, Purple Line Express trains stop at Sheridan before weekday night games in order to provide an additional connection for passengers traveling from Evanston, Skokie and northern Chicago. After weekday night games, northbound Purple Line passengers are told to board at Sheridan, while southbound passengers are told to board at Addison.

At the conclusion of games, the scoreboard operator raises to the top of the center field scoreboard either a white flag with a blue "W" to signify a Cubs victory or a blue flag with a white "L" for a loss. This is done to show the outcome of the game to passengers on passing "L" trains, and also to anyone passing by the park. The basic flag color was once the exact opposite of the colors used today (the rationale being that white is the traditional color for surrender). In addition to rail service, the CTA provides several bus routes which service Wrigley. CTA bus routes 22 Clark, 152 Addison and 154 Wrigley Field Express all provide access to the ballpark. Pace also operates the 282 Schaumburg-Wrigley Field Express from Woodfield Mall in Schaumburg and the 779 Yorktown-Wrigley Field Express from Yorktown Shopping Center in Lombard. Biking to the field is also a popular alternative. As Halsted, Addison, and Clark streets all have designated biking lanes, getting to the field via bicycle is a widely used way to avoid hectic pre- and postgame traffic; Wrigley Field offers a complimentary bike check program to accommodate for them. Cyclists may check their bikes up to 2 hours before games at the bike racks off of Waveland Ave, and may pick up their bikes up to one hour after games end.

Parking in the area remains scarce, but that does not seem to bother fans who want to come to this baseball mecca, which drew over three million fans from 2004 until 2011, averaging to a near-sellout every day of the season, even with many weekday afternoon games. The little parking that is available around the park can go for as much as $100 per space. To partially alleviate this problem, the Cubs sponsor a parking shuttle service from the nearby DeVry University campus at Belmont and Western as part of their agreement with local neighborhood groups. This was not available during the last World Series prior to 2016, in 1945 against the Detroit Tigers, so cars parked as much as a mile away on residential streets and fans walked to Wrigley Field.

Commemorative stamps
In 2001, a series of commemorative postage stamps on the subject of baseball parks was issued by the U.S. Postal Service. Most of them were engravings taken from old colorized postcards, including the illustration of Wrigley Field. In the case of Wrigley, the famous scoreboard was sliced off, presumably to hide the original postcard's banner containing the park's name. It may also be observed that the original black-and-white aerial photo, from the 1945 World Series, was taken from nearly the identical spot as the photo of the 1935 Series, allowing a comparison before and after the 1937 alterations to the bleachers. The stamp and its sources also provide a rare look at the center field bleachers filled with spectators, a practice which was later discontinued due to the risk to batters, who might lose the flight of a pitch amidst the white shirts. This led to the development of darker backgrounds to the pitcher's mounds.

See also

History of Wrigley Field
List of events at Wrigley Field

Notes

References

SourcesA Day at the Park, by William HartelBallparks of North America, by Michael BensonCubs Journal, by John SnyderGreen Cathedrals, by Philip J. LowryWrigleyville: A Magical History Tour of the Chicago Cubs, by Peter GolenbockWrigley Field: The Long Life and Contentious Times of the Friendly Confines'', by Stuart Shea
 Top 10 Ballparks of 2008 by Devin Pratt

External links

 Stadium site on MLB.com
 Restore Wrigley Field
 Wrigley Field facts, figures, photos and more
 Wrigley Field News 
 Zachary Taylor Davis
 1060 Project 
 Sanborn map showing future site of the ballpark, 1894

 
1914 establishments in Illinois
American football venues in Chicago
Baseball venues in Chicago
Boxing venues in Chicago
Chicago Bears stadiums
Chicago Cardinals stadiums
Chicago Cubs stadiums
Chicago Landmarks
Chicago Sting sports facilities
College football venues
Defunct National Football League venues
Defunct soccer venues in the United States
DePaul Blue Demons football
Ice hockey venues in Chicago
Jewel Box parks
Major League Baseball venues
National Historic Landmarks in Illinois
North American Soccer League (1968–1984) stadiums
North Side, Chicago
Outdoor ice hockey venues in the United States
Soccer venues in Chicago
Sports venues completed in 1914
Sports venues in Chicago
Tourist attractions in Chicago
Wrigley Company